Operation Hotel Intercontinental was an attack on the InterContinental Dhaka hotel on 9 June 1971, in Dhaka, then part of East Pakistan, in the Bangladesh Liberation War. The attack was carried out by members of the commando unit of Mukti Bahini.

Formation and deployment of Crack Platoon
In June 1971, the World Bank sent a mission to observe the situation in East Pakistan. The media cell of Pakistan government maintained that the situation in East Pakistan was stable. Major Khaled Mosharraf, a sector commander of Mukti Bahini, planned to deploy a special commando team. The task assigned to the team was to carry out commando operations and to terrorise Dhaka. The main objective of this team was to prove that the situation was not stable. Moreover, Pakistan at that time was expecting economic aid. The plan was to stop the World Bank mission, and to make the UNHCR understand the true situation of East Pakistan, and therefore not provide financial aid. Khaled, along with Major ATM Hyder (a former SSG Commando), another sector commander, formed the Crack Platoon, initially of 17 members. They received commando training in Melaghar Camp. From Melaghar, commandos of the Crack Platoon headed for Dhaka on 4 June 1971 and launched the guerrilla operation on 5 June. Later, the number of commandos was increased, and the platoon was split and deployed in different areas surrounding Dhaka city.

Operation Hotel Intercontinental
On 9 June 1971 the commandos launched the first attack at InterContinental Dhaka. The commandos stopped in a car in front of the hotel, armed with ENERGA grenades, bayonets, and submachine guns. Five grenades were thrown in the attack.
The operation was reported in BBC news. That was, many Pakistani soldiers were killed and wounded.

References

1971 in Bangladesh
Bangladesh Liberation War
June 1971 events in Bangladesh
Military history of Bangladesh
1970s in Dhaka